Altarpiece of the Holy Sacrament or Triptych of the Last Supper is a 1464-1468 dated triptych attributed to Dieric Bouts, now reassembled and held at its location of origin at St. Peter's Church, Leuven.

Description

The Last Supper is the theme of the central panel of the altarpiece, commissioned from Bouts by the Leuven Confraternity of the Holy Sacrament in 1464. All of the orthogonals in this composition display an understanding of linear perspective. The lines lead to a single vanishing point in the center of the mantelpiece above Christ's head, though outside the room, the small side room has its own vanishing point, and neither it nor the vanishing point of the main room falls on the horizon of the landscape seen through the windows. 

Dieric Bouts was not a native of Leuven. He moved there from Haarlem and his Last Supper was the first Flemish panel painting of its kind. In this central panel, Bouts has introduced the idea of a group portrait around a table, a theme known to council members in Haarlem. Christ is depicted larger than life in the role of a priest performing the consecration of the Eucharistic host from the Catholic Mass. The men around him are shown a half-size smaller, and probably are accurate portraits of prominent members of the confraternity. Bouts was not the only artist traveling between Haarlem and Leuven. While he was working on this triptych, the church was still being built and the architect Antoon I Keldermans was the same man hired by the Haarlem parish.

Bouts main contribution to Flemish painting was his introduction of everyday details in the main panel such as the houses on the other side of the market square that can be seen through the windows, and the servants dressed in modern clothing beyond the central scene around the table. Although once identified as the artist himself and his two sons, these servants are most likely more portraits of the confraternity's members responsible for commissioning the altarpiece. This painting was copied by Aelbrecht Bouts, who disregarded the architectural elements through the windows, because by that time the church and the town square had changed. Leuven had built a new town hall, for which Dieric also made a large panel as an allegory of justice.

History
The work was documented by Leuven archivist Edward van Even in 1870 and lent to his friend James Weale for his 1902 Exhibition of Flemish Primitives in Bruges.

The Altarpiece of the Holy Sacrament has four additional panels, two on each side. Because these were taken to the museums in Berlin and Munich in the 19th century, the reconstruction of the original altarpiece has been difficult. Today it is thought that the panel with Abraham and Melchizedek is above the Passover Feast on the left wing, while the Gathering of the Manna is above Elijiah and the Angel on the right wing. All of these are typological precursors to the Last Supper in the central panel.

The church has two paintings by Bouts on display, the Last Supper (1464–1468) and The Martyrdom of St Erasmus (1465). The Nazis seized The Last Supper in 1942. Panels from the painting had been sold legitimately to German museums in the 1800s, and Germany was forced to return all the panels as part of the required reparations of the Versailles Treaty after World War I. The chancel and ambulatory were turned into a museum in 1998, where visitors can view a collection of sculptures, paintings and metalwork.

References

The Last Supper on Flemish Primitives website
Last Supper on Belgian cultural heritage archive

1460s paintings
Paintings by Dieric Bouts
Restitution
Collections of M – Museum Leuven
Altarpieces
Paintings of the Last Supper
Paintings depicting Elijah